Johannes Meursius (van Meurs) (9 February 1579 – 20 September 1639) was a Dutch classical scholar and antiquary.

Biography
Meursius was born Johannes van Meurs at Loosduinen, near The Hague. He was extremely precocious, and at the age of sixteen produced a commentary on the Cassandra of Lycophron. For ten years he was the tutor to the children of Johan van Oldenbarnevelt, accompanying the family on Oldenbarnevelt's diplomatic missions to many of the courts of Europe. While on such a trip, in 1608 he obtained a doctorate of Law in Orléans. In 1610 he was appointed professor of Greek and history at Leiden, and in the following year historiographer to the States-General of the Netherlands. After Oldenbarnevelt's execution in 1619, though he had attempted to remain neutral in religious affairs, Meursius was seen as leaning toward Arminianism, or Remonstrant beliefs by reason of his service to the Oldenbarnevelt children, and his position at Leiden was challenged. In consequence of this he welcomed the offer (1625) of Christian IV of Denmark to become professor of history and politics at Soro, in Zealand, combined with the office of historiographer royal, in which role he produced a Latin history of Denmark (1630–38), Historia Danica. He died in Sorø.

Meursius was the author of classical editions and treatises, many of which are printed in J.F. Gronovius's Thesaurus antiquitatum graecarum. Their lack of arrangement detracts from their value, but they are a storehouse of information, and Meursius does not deserve the epithets of "pedant"  and "ignoramus" which Joseph Justus Scaliger applied to him. Meursius also wrote about the troubles in the Netherlands.

Meursius also authored the Glossarium graeco-barbarum, one of the first dictionaries of Modern Greek.

Complete edition of his works by J. Lami (1741–1763). See Van der Aa's Biographisch Woordenboek der Nederlanden (1869), and J.E. Sandys, History of Classical Scholarship (1908), ii. 311.

Satyra sotadica
The School of Women first appeared as a work in Latin entitled Aloisiae Sigaeae, Toletanae, Satyra sotadica de arcanis Amoris et Veneris. This manuscript claimed that it was originally written in Spanish by Luisa Sigea de Velasco, an erudite poet and maid of honor at the court of Lisbon and was then translated into Latin by Jean or Johannes Meursius. The attribution to Sigea was a lie and Meursius was a complete fabrication; the true author was Nicolas Chorier.

Selected works 
 1612: Res Belgicae,  Lugduni Batavorum
 1614: Glossarium graecobarbarum, Lugduni Batavorum
 1617: Lectiones Atticae,  Lugduni Batavorum
 1619: Eleusinia, siue, De Cereris Eleusinae sacro, ac festo: Liber Singularis, Lugduni Batavorum
 1625: Athenae Batavae,  Lugduni Batavorum
 1630: Historia Danica, Hafniae
 1684: Theseus; sive de ejus vita rebusque gestis liber postumus. Accedunt ejusdem Paralipomena de pagis Atticis, et excerpta ex ... Jacobi Sponii Itinerario de iisdem pagis. Ultrajecti: apud Franciscum Halma (On J. F. Gronovius's Thesaurus antiquitatum graecarum)

References and sources
References

Sources

Further reading
 Heesakkers, C. L. "Te weinig koren of alleen te veel kaf? Leiden's eerste Noordnederlandse filoloog Joannes Meursius (1579–1639)", in: Miro Fervore. Een bundel lezingen & artikelen over de beoefening van de klassieke wetenschappen in de zeventiende & achttiende eeuw, Leiden 1994, pp. 13–26
 Skovgaard-Petersen, Karen Historiography at the Court of Christian IV (1588–1648): studies in the Latin histories of Denmark by Johannes Pontanus and Johannes Meursius'', Copenhagen, 2002

1579 births
1639 deaths
17th-century Latin-language writers
Dutch classical scholars
Writers from The Hague
Classical scholars of Leiden University